Denis Petrovich Sinyayev (born 13 October 1984) is a Russian former professional football player.

Club career
He made his Russian Football National League debut for FC Avangard Kursk on 19 April 2005 in a game against FC Dynamo Makhachkala.

External links
 

1984 births
Living people
Russian footballers
Association football midfielders
FC Avangard Kursk players